Baker County School District or Baker County Schools may refer to:
Baker County School District (Florida)
Baker County School District (Georgia)